The Principal Secretary is a senior government official in various Commonwealth countries.

 Principal Secretary to the Prime Minister of Pakistan
 Principal Secretary to the President of Pakistan
 Principal Secretary to the Prime Minister of India
 Principal Secretary (Canada)
 Principal Secretary (India)

See also
 Chief of Staff
 Chief Secretary (disambiguation)
 General secretary
Permanent secretary
 Principal Private Secretary
 Provincial secretary